Miserden is a village and civil parish in Stroud District, Gloucestershire, England, 4 miles north east of Stroud.  The parish includes Whiteway Colony and the hamlets of Sudgrove and The Camp.  In the 2001 census the parish had a population of 420, increasing to 449 at the 2011 census.

The village lies in the Cotswolds at an elevation of over 800 ft, above the valley of the River Frome.

Until the Middle Ages, Miserden was known as Greenhampstead, and was mentioned by that name in the Domesday Book.  The name Miserden derives from Musardera, "Musard's manor" - Musard was the name of the family which held the manor at the time of the Domesday Book. Robert Musard built Miserden Castle in the 12th century.

In fiction
The battle and siege scenes in Brother Cadfael's Penance by Ellis Peters (a pen name of Edith Pargeter) are set in the castle built by the Musard family, given the name of "La Musarderie" in the novel. The story is set in the 12th century, in December 1145 as the Anarchy reaches stalemate. The book includes a map of Greenhamsted, the castle and nearby Winstone, and the road that leads either to Gloucester or the other way, to Cirencester, to an Augustinian monastery.

Church
The Church of England parish church, dedicated to St Andrew, is of Saxon origin, though one leading authority has commented severely that "most of its archaeological interest was destroyed in the drastic nineteenth-century restoration". However, the same authority concedes that "the sanctuary is beautiful" and also praises the monuments in the church to Sir William Sandys (d.1640) and William Kingston (d.1614).  The church is a Grade II* listed building.

Miserden War Memorial is opposite the church.  The memorial was designed by the renowned architect Sir Edwin Lutyens and is a grade II listed building.

House and gardens 
The original house was constructed in the 1620s with a large garden laid out at around the same time. A large area of glass houses was added in the early part of the 20th century, now used to house a Nursery and Cafe for visitors. Further additions and reshaping of the garden were done by Edwin Lutyens, who contributed the five-bay Tuscan loggia. The gardens are today open to the public.

References

External links

Villages in Gloucestershire
Stroud District
Civil parishes in Gloucestershire